Douentza Cercle  is an administrative subdivision of the Mopti Region of Mali. The administrative center (chef-lieu) is the town of Douentza. 

During the Tuareg rebellion of 2012, it was the southernmost part of the state of Azawad, according to the April 2012 MNLA's territorial claim. From June 2012 it was claimed by a series of rival Islamist and local militias.  

The route of the annual circular migration of the Gourma elephants crosses a number of communes in the cercles of Douentza and  Gourma-Rharous (Tombouctou Region).

The cercle is divided into 15 communes:

Dallah
Dangol Boré
Débéré
Dianwéli
Djaptodji
Douentza
Gandamia
Haïré
Hombori
Kéréna
Korarou
Koubéwel Koundia
Mondoro
Pétaka
Tédjé

References

Cercles of Mali
Mopti Region
Azawad